Tilku (also Romanized as Tīlkū; also known as Īrān Khvāh, Īrān Shāh, Mīrānshāh, Mīrzā Īrānshāh, and Tīlkūh) is a village in Tilakuh Rural District, Ziviyeh District, Saqqez County, Kurdistan Province, Iran. At the 2006 census, its population was 966, in 201 families. The village is populated by Kurds.

References 

Towns and villages in Saqqez County
Kurdish settlements in Kurdistan Province